The following is a list of locomotives built for the Great Northern Railway. As is customary, engine classes are organized according to the man who was locomotive superintendent when the class was introduced, and to whom the design is often attributed. Six men held this post during the existence of the Great Northern Railway.

Until 1868 engines were obtained from outside manufacturers, but after this date were increasingly built at the railway's own Doncaster Works, commonly known as the "Plant".

Some engines acquired second-hand or from absorbed companies have been omitted from these lists.

The system of classes was introduced in 1900. Engines withdrawn prior to that date will not have them.

Benjamin Cubitt (1846–1848)

Edward Bury (1848–1850)

Bury resigned after it was discovered he had placed orders for parts with his own firm, rather than another one which had offered a lower bid.

Archibald Sturrock (1850–1866)

Patrick Stirling (1866–1895)
Stirling built locomotives with domeless ("straightback") boilers.
Many were rebuilt by Ivatt with larger, domed boilers, and were placed
in a different class as shown in the table.

Henry Ivatt (1895–1911)

Nigel Gresley (1911–1923)

Preserved locomotives

References

 Locomotives
Locomotives of the Great Northern Railway (Great Britain)
Great Northern Railway (Great Britain)
Great Northern Railway (Great Britain)
Great Northern Railway (Great Britain)
!Great Northern Railway